Stratusfaction may refer to:

 Stratusfaction (TV series), a 1973 Canadian music television series
 Stratusfaction, an instance of professional wrestling aerial techniques